The Bird Is the Most Popular Finger is the third release by Shellac. The title is a parodic reference to the album The Pigeon Is the Most Popular Bird by Six Finger Satellite, and was originally the title of an article on Shellac that appeared in the magazine Alternative Press after the release of the band's earlier singles. It is a two song 7" released in 1994 on Drag City. It was Shellac's first non-Touch and Go release.

The first song "The Admiral" is an instrumental version of a song that would later appear on Shellac's At Action Park album later that year.  "XVI" is an alternate version of the song "Pull the Cup", also on At Action Park.  Both songs were recorded in Todd Trainer's loft apartment, as documented by a photographic print included with the single.  The liner notes detail every musical instrument and every piece of recording equipment used on the single.

Track listing

Side A
 "The Admiral" - 2:33

Side B
 "XVI" - 3:42

Personnel
Steve Albini - guitar, vocals, recording engineer
Todd Trainer - drums
Bob Weston - bass guitar, recording engineer

References
 Review at AllMusic

1994 singles
Shellac (band) songs
1994 songs
Song articles with missing songwriters
Drag City (record label) singles